The States of Flevoland are the States-Provincial for the Dutch province of Flevoland. It forms the legislative body of the province. Its 39 seats are distributed every four years in provincial elections. Since 2008, it is chaired by Leen Verbeek (PvdA).

Current composition
Since the 2019 provincial elections, the distribution of seats of the States of Flevoland has been as follows:

See also
 Provincial politics in the Netherlands

References

External links
  

Politics of Flevoland
Flevoland